The Koolhoven F.K.58 was a single engine, interceptor-fighter aircraft designed and mainly manufactured by N V Koolhoven in the Netherlands under contract by France. Intended for Armée de l'Air use, the F.K.58 saw limited service in the Battle of France.

Design and development

In 1938, the French Air Ministry noticed that domestic aircraft manufacturing capacity could not re-equip the Armée de l'Air with modern fighters quickly enough. In order to win some contracts with the French, the Dutch manufacturer Koolhoven quickly designed a single-seat fighter that would use French-supplied engines and other components. The Koolhoven fighter was intended primarily for fighter units based in the colony of French Indochina.

The prototype, designed by Erich Schatzki and powered by a Hispano-Suiza 14AA radial engine, flew for the first time on 17 July 1938. The structure of the fuselage consisted of welded steel tubing covered with sheet metal (front part) and fabric (aft); the wing had 2 wooden box spar members and ribs, with a bakelite stressed skin covering. Aerodynamically balanced split flaps on the wing trailing edges ensure a lower landing speed. The oleo-pneumatic undercarriage retracted inwards with the wheels housed in the lower fuselage faired into the lower engine cowling by small doors. The empennage is built up from wood and control surfaces are metal framed with fabric covering.

In January 1939, the Armée de l'Air placed an order for 50 aircraft, to be powered by Gnome-Rhône 14N engines.

Due to the unavailability of Gnome-Rhône engines and French instruments, just 17 aircraft – six F.K.58s and 11 F.K.58As – were completed at the Koolhoven works, with Dutch-supplied engines and instruments – and delivered to the Armée de l'Air. The remaining 23 aircraft, which were at different stages of completion, were transferred to Nevers, where the aircraft were to be finished by personnel employed by Koolhoven. However, only one F.K.58 was completed before the factory was captured by the Germans, together with the remaining airframes.

In July 1939, the Dutch government placed an order on behalf of the Luchtvaart Afdeling (Netherlands Army Aviation Corps) for 36 F.K.58s, powered by Bristol Taurus engines. As the  British government restricted exports of the Taurus, they were to be replaced by Dutch stocks of the Bristol Mercury VIII (as used by the Dutch Fokker D.21 and Fokker G.1).

The F.K.58s comprising the Dutch order were in various stages of construction when they were destroyed by a German air raid on the Koolhoven factory in May 1940.

Had the Armée de l'Air received its full order of 50 aircraft, before for the Battle of France, it is unlikely that they would have changed the outcome. Even though Koolhoven credited the F.K.58 prototype with high performance, French test centers recorded that the series aircraft were  slower than what was claimed by the manufacturer. Additionally, the manoeuvrability was found to be poor by the French pilots.

Operational history

The F.K.58 was originally ordered to serve with AdA units based in French overseas territories. On 16 May 1940, however, the type was assigned to four small ad hoc Free Polish air force units. Their official name were patrouilles ("patrols") – as the AdA designated units that defended rear areas against long-range bombers and other enemy aircraft, as part of the Défense Aérienne du Territoire ("Territorial Air Defense"; DAT). Two of the units operated from Salon-de-Provence, and the other two from Clermont-Aulnat air base. Polish captain Walerian Jasionowski was the commander of all four patrouilles.

By May 1940, 13 aircraft were operational with Eskadra Koolhoven.  As delivered, however, the fighters were unarmed and the Poles had to acquire machine guns and fit them. From 30 May 1940, they were in service, patrolling firstly in the Avignon-Marseille area, and then over Clermont-Ferrand. At least 47 operational sorties were recorded, but the Escadron did not encounter enemy aircraft.

The type's service life was short-lived, but no less than five F.K.58s were lost in May and June 1940. After the fall of France, all surviving airframes were scrapped.

Variants
F.K.58 Prototype
Prototype powered by 1,080 hp Hispano-Suiza 14AA engine, 1 built.
F.K.58 (Dutch demonstrator)
Demonstrator for the Luchtvaart Afdeling, powered by a Bristol Mercury engine, 1 built.
F.K.58 [Bristol Taurus]
Dutch version powered by Bristol Taurus engine, projected Dutch aircraft, none built.
F.K.58
First production variant powered by Hispano-Suiza 14AA radial engine, 4 built.
F.K.58A
Production version powered by Gnome-Rhône 14N-39 engine, 13 built.

Operators

 Armée de l'Air

 Polish Air Forces in exile in France
  operated twelve aircraft, all were FK.58As.

Specifications (F.K.58)

See also

Notes

Bibliography

 Green, William. Warplanes of the Second World War: Fighters. Volume III London: Macdonald & Co.(Publishers), 1961. .
 Taylor, John W.R. "Koolhoven F.K.58." Combat Aircraft of the World from 1909 to the present. New York: G.P. Putnam's Sons, 1969. .

External links

 Koolhoven Aeroplanes Foundation

FK58
Single-engined tractor aircraft
1930s Dutch fighter aircraft
Low-wing aircraft
Aircraft first flown in 1938
France–Netherlands military relations